Zbojné is a village and municipality in the Medzilaborce District in the Prešov Region of far north-eastern Slovakia.

History
In historical records the village was first mentioned in 1463.

Geography
The municipality lies at an altitude of 265 metres and covers an area of 18.155 km². It has a population of about 200 people.

Gallery

References

External links
 
 
https://web.archive.org/web/20071116010355/http://www.statistics.sk/mosmis/eng/run.html

Villages and municipalities in Medzilaborce District